Oberdachstetten (East Franconian: Dōchschdedn) is a municipality in the district of Ansbach in Bavaria in Germany.

Gallery

References

Ansbach (district)